Taloyoak Airport  is located  west of Taloyoak, Nunavut, Canada, and is operated by the Government of Nunavut.

Airlines and destinations

References

External links

Certified airports in the Kitikmeot Region